A tug of war tournament was held on July 18–19 during the 2009 World Games at the Gymnasium of the Guo-Guang Laboratory School in National Sun Yat-sen University. The outdoor tournament took place during both days, while the indoor tournament was held only on July 19.

Medals table

Medal summary

References

2009 World Games
2009
2009 in tug of war